Protracted social conflict is a technical term that generally refers to conflicts described by other researchers as protracted or intractable: complex, severe, commonly enduring, and often violent. The term was presented in a theory developed by Edward Azar.

Protracted social conflict as Edward Azar termed it, denotes hostile interactions between communal groups that are based in deep-seated racial, ethnic, religious and cultural hatreds, and that persist over long periods of time with sporadic outbreaks of violence; when a group's identity is threatened or frustrated, intractable conflict is almost inevitable.

Definition of protracted social conflict
Protracted social conflicts is a theory developed by Edward Azar. The term refers to conflict situations characterized by the prolonged and often violent struggle by communal groups for such basic needs as security, recognition, acceptance, fair access to political institutions, and economic participation.

The communal groups may experience deep-seated cleavages based upon racial, religious, cultural or ethnic lines. These cleavages are characterized by continuing hostility with sporadic outbreaks of violence; and caused by the frustration of human needs for security, recognition, and distributive justice.

Such identity-driven rifts are the result of an underlying fear of extinction that often grows within vulnerable ethnic groups who live with the memories or fear of persecution and massacre. Ethnic divisions and perceived threats often result in the domination of the state machinery by a single group or coalition of elites who deny access to basic human needs for the majority of the population.

Preconditions to violent conflict
Azar argued that the denial of basic human needs to a large portion of the population initiated instances of protracted social violence. Four preconditions are isolated by Azar as the predominant sources of protracted social conflict: communal content, deprivation of human needs, governance and the State's role, and international linkages.

Communal content
This element, which contributes to the initial creation of protracted social conflict, consists of the fact that people involved in protracted social conflicts create their own identity groups. Azar notes, "that it is the relationship between identity groups and the states, which is at the core of the problem." He also cited the "disarticulation between the state and society as a whole" as a source of violence within a society.

This precondition also involves the reliance that many people have on their social groups; because governments in areas that experience protracted social conflict are often unable, incapable or unwilling to provide basic human necessities to the population, individuals turn to their social groups for stability. The resultant disconnection of society and the state can be linked to the colonial legacy, which, "artificially imposed European ideas of territorial statehood onto a multitude of communal groups."

This results in the domination of certain identity groups over others. The dominant group isolates itself from the needs of other groups, leading to an even bigger separation between groups even within an ethnicity. To overcome this division of society, national identity must be stressed over individual group identity.

Deprivation of human needs
To alleviate the "underdevelopments" Azar holds responsible for protracted social violence, and in turn overcome the conflict resulting from underdevelopment, Azar points to the needs of security, development, political access and identity in terms of cultural and religious expression. Azar refers to these needs as non-negotiable; therefore, if these needs are not met, people will inevitably want a structural change to take place. Such a need for structural change is likely to result in a violent conflict.

This in turn emphasizes Azar's theory that the "deprivation of human needs is the underlying source of protracted social conflict" where conflict is emphasized by the collective grievances of a group of people. To overcome this deprivation of human needs to entire groups of people, the government must offer security on a multiplicity of levels to all of the constituent population.

Governance and the State's role
With government being "endowed with the authority to govern and use force where necessary to regulate society, to protect citizens, and to provide collective goods," the government plays a leading role in the satisfaction or lack of satisfaction of minority and identity groups.

Azar states that protracted social conflicts can be characterized by "incompetent, parochial, fragile, and authoritarian governments that fail to satisfy basic human needs." It is said that governments, expected to be unbiased and impartial, tend to be dominated by the leading identity groups or those groups that have been able to monopolize power within a country or territorial entity. This creates a "crisis of legitimacy" in the governance of these countries. The structure of the government needs to be changed so that all citizens are equally cared for and equally represented without bias or corruption.

International linkages
This involves the "political-economic relations of economic dependency within the international economic system, and the network of political-military linkages constituting regional and global patterns of clientage and cross-border interest."

Weaker states, like those often involved in protracted social conflict, tend to be more influenced by outside connections both economically and politically. For example, many states are dependent on an external supply of armament. To overcome the dominance of the international economy, the country in question must work to build institutions that can ease global dependency and stimulate domestic economic growth.

Resolving protracted social conflict
As Edward Azar stated:

Conflict resolution approaches that focus on resources, or the interests of parties, may be appropriate means of conflict resolution in conflicts where the only issues are those of resource and interests; however, in protracted social conflicts the main issue is identity-based. Therefore, to be effective, a conflict resolution framework must specifically emphasize the needs and identities of the conflicting parties.

ARIA model
Rothman developed a unique approach of conflict resolution that is specifically designed to mitigate protracted social conflict. He terms this approach the ARIA model. In contrast to the model of interactive conflict resolution (ICR) that Fisher proposed in 1996, which includes identity as one of many human needs, the ARIA model "keeps its focus more narrowly attuned to identity issues in particular." Rothman and Olson suggest that conflict can only be truly resolved when identity issues have been sufficiently addressed.

The ARIA model is a comprehensive, yet specific approach to resolving protracted social conflict. It attempts to break down "the barrier of identity through a four-phased process." The various stages of the ARIA model are outlined below:

Antagonism (adversarial framing)
This first step focuses on the tangible "what of the conflict." It is defined in "us" versus "them" terms and calls on the various entities to elaborate and make clear their underlying values and needs. By bringing animosities to the forefront, it is hoped that the mutual benefits of ending the conflict can be realized.

Resonance (reflexive–reframing)
After parties have articulated their animosities, the next stage is termed the reflexive–reframing stage where the "why" and "who" of the issue is examined. The identity needs of all sides are brought to the forefront with the goal of getting "the disputants to move from positional bargaining to interest-based approaches." Rothman and Olson suggest that the parties should now engage in a "deep dialogue" to give a voice and structure to the underlying needs of the various parties. The needs of the various parties are, in turn, the underlying causes of the conflict. The effect of this stage is termed resonance, as each side has articulated their core concerns and heard the concerns of the other actors. At this point, actors begin to see where their identities converge, and where they diverge.

Invention
The third stage is termed "inventing" and focuses on the "how" of "cooperatively resolving the conflict and its core through integrative solutions." This stage suggests a mutual attempt by all actors involved to create a mean of ending the conflict. It is suggested by Rothman and Olson that since both parties have now come to recognize the other's identity through the two previous stages, "they can concretely explore collaboratively how the tangible issues ... of the conflict can be resolved without threatening the identity of the other." The invention of possible means of solutions leads directly to the fourth stage.

Action
The fourth and final stage of the ARIA model addresses the "why" and "who" of the conflict, as well as the "how" of cooperation through the tangible "what" of solutions. Here, the conflict resolution process based on identity is completed by the concrete outlining of future actions. This stage leads to the tangible resolution of the conflict.

Protracted social conflict in Sri Lanka

The Sri Lankan conflict exists primarily between the two majority ethnic groups, the Sinhalese, who are mostly Buddhist and represent around 74% of the population, and the Tamil, who are mostly Hindu, representing around 18%. The majority of Tamils live in northern and eastern provinces and claim them as their traditional homeland.

Since its independence in 1948 there has been a conflict between Sinhalese, which gained control over the Sri Lankan government, and different Tamil separatist movements. Among the Sinhalese, the anti-Tamil chauvinism started to spread and the Tamils were more and more disadvantaged and excluded. The incidents escalated into a war in July 1983, after the island-wide pogrom against Tamils.

Tamil secessionists saw the establishment of their own separate state as the only way for securing their people. The war, that has continued since then, has almost completely disrupted civil administration in the northern province and caused economic devastation of the whole country. As a consequence of this ethno-political violence around 65,000 people have been killed, hundreds of thousands injured, and millions displaced.

Among various Tamil separatist groups that have emerged, the Liberation Tigers of Tamil Eelam (LTTE) have risen as the dominant fighting force in Sri Lanka. Their tactics, proscribed as terrorist by many countries, are ruthless, brutal and highly efficient in eliminating their opposition. They run a parallel government in many areas of the north and east of Sri Lanka.

Since the start of war there were some attempts to reach a ceasefire. In 2002 the Ceasefire agreement was signed, and the government agreed to disarm all paramilitary groups in the north and east. But hostilities continued and even intensified.

Government security forces conquered the LTTE on May 19, 2009 ending the conflict.

Protracted social conflict in Cyprus

Before the independence of Cyprus, the island's Greek and Turkish communities coexisted relatively peacefully. The major conflict began with the independence in 1960, when Greek community wanted a union (enosis) with Greece, to which the Turkish community opposed. The 1960 constitution brought a complex system of power-sharing, but both groups wanted to gain more advantages.

When Greek Cypriots wanted to reduce autonomy and representation of Turkish Cypriots, the latter opposed it and intercommunal violence broke out. That led the two communities to embark on a hostile and protracted process of separation and segregation.

With the military coup in 1974 the situation erupted into a major crisis. Turkish military intervention followed and Turkish forces occupied around 38% of the northern part of the island. This invasion caused an exodus of about 160,000 Greek Cypriots to the south. Later voluntary regrouping of population resulted in another 10,000 Greek Cypriots leaving the northern part, and 40,000 Turkish Cypriots moving to the north, which created two homogeneous ethnic zones on the island.

In 1975 the northern part declared Turkish Federated State of Cyprus, which declared independence in 1983 as the Turkish Republic of Northern Cyprus, recognized only by Turkey. In 1990s the southern Republic of Cyprus applied for a membership in the European Union, and the Turkish Cypriots on the other side turned to Turkey.

Although the Cyprus conflict now lasts for a long time, its resolution does not seem to be close. Numerous peace proposals and plans have been made, but more or less unsuccessful. The pre-1974 proposals of different federal or centralist arrangements failed as one or the other side rejected them. The division in 1974 changed the demographics of Cyprus dramatically, putting it in a position where federalist model would be the most appropriate. But again, because of opposing interests all the proposals failed.

See also
 Balkanization
 Criticism of multiculturalism
 Homophily
 Sectarian violence
 Social polarization

References

Conflict (process)
Dispute resolution
Sectarian violence